Martin Jedlička (born 24 January 1998) is a Czech professional footballer who plays as a goalkeeper for Bohemians 1905 on loan from Viktoria Plzeň.

He made his league debut in Mladá Boleslav's Czech First League 0–3 loss at Sparta Prague on 3 December 2017. On his debut, he scored an own goal in the 12th minute by misjudging Eidar Civić's cross, parrying the ball into the goalpost and then deflecting it into his own net. This was the first Czech First League goal to be confirmed by video review.

References

External links 
 
 Martin Jedlička official international statistics
 
 Martin Jedlička profile on the FK Mladá Boleslav official website

1998 births
Living people
Sportspeople from Příbram
Czech footballers
Czech Republic youth international footballers
Czech Republic under-21 international footballers
Czech expatriate footballers
Association football goalkeepers
Czech First League players
FK Mladá Boleslav players
FC DAC 1904 Dunajská Streda players
Slovak Super Liga players
Expatriate footballers in Slovakia
Czech expatriate sportspeople in Slovakia
FC Viktoria Plzeň players
Bohemians 1905 players